Chelleli Kapuram is 1971 Indian Telugu-language film directed by K. Viswanath. This is the first movie produced by senior actor Mannava Balayya under the banner of Amrutha films. The film was remade as Anbu Thangai.

Plot
Ramu (Sobhan Babu) is a struggling poet. Because of his dark complexion, publishers are unwilling to publish his poetry. Sriram (Nagabhushanam) is his friend, and a small-time con-artist. He agrees to support Ramu. He starts to publish his poems in Sriram's name. He agrees to do this as he needs money to perform his sister's marriage.

Sriram marries Ramu's sister (Sharada). As time goes by, using the poetry written by Ramu, Sriram gets quite rich. With the wealth come bad habits, and other habits. Ramu keeps quiet to ensure his sister's married life smooth, and does not confront Sriram. A rich lady (Vanisri) who admires the poetry of Sriram and becomes a fan. Over the period she realizes Sriram is a fraud, and suspects the truth. She comes up with a ruse to expose Sriram and elicit the truth.

Cast 

 Sobhan Babu as Ramu
 Nagabhushanam as Sriram
 Vanisri as a rich lady
 Sharada as 
 Ramu(Sjobhanbabu)'s sister name actress Manimala not actress Sharada.

Songs
 "Bhale Bhale Maa Annayya" - P. Susheela, S. P. Balasubrahmanyam (Lyrics: Kosaraju Raghavaiah)
 "Charana Kinkinulu...Adave Mayuri" - S. P. Balasubrahmanyam (Lyrics: C. Narayanareddy)
 "Ee Daari Naa Swamy Nadichene... Rane Vacchadu" - S. Janaki, P. B. Sreenivas  (Lyrics: Devulapalli Krishnasastri)
 "Kanula Mundu Neevunte Kavita Pongi Paarada" - P. Susheela, S. P. Balasubrahmanyam (Lyrics: C. Narayanareddy)
 "Naa Chitti Naa Chinni" - P. Susheela, B. Vasantha 
 "Kavithalu Pillagaali" - S. P. Balasubrahmanyam

Awards
 Nandi Award for Best Feature Film - Gold - Mannava Venkata Rao

References

External links
 

1970s Telugu-language films
1971 films
Films directed by K. Viswanath
Films scored by K. V. Mahadevan
Telugu films remade in other languages